273P/Pons–Gambart, also called Comet Pons-Gambart, is a short-period comet first discovered on June 21, 1827 by Jean-Louis Pons and Jean-Félix Adolphe Gambart. It has a 186 year orbit. It fits the classical definition of a Halley-type comet with (20 years < period < 200 years). It was lost and was not recovered until November 7, 2012, when amateur astronomer Rob Matson discovered a comet, and it was identified that the pre-recovery short-arc orbital calculations for Pons-Gambart were completely wrong because the comet only had a 1-month observation arc with poor data.

The original name when first discovered was C/1827 M1. Before the 2012 return, when Comet Pons–Gambart was speculated to have a roughly 60 year orbit it was suspected of possibly being comet 1110 K1.

Of the numbered periodic comets only 153P/Ikeya-Zhang has a longer orbital period.

See also
 Marseilles Observatory

References
 

Periodic comets
273P
0273